The monarchy of Grenada is a system of government in which a hereditary monarch is the sovereign and head of state of Grenada. The present monarch is King Charles III, who is also Sovereign of a number of the other Commonwealth realms. The King's constitutional roles are mostly delegated to the Governor-General of Grenada. Royal succession is governed by the English Act of Settlement of 1701, which is part of constitutional law.

International and domestic role

The Grenadian Monarchy is a shared monarchy. Fifty-six states are members of the Commonwealth of Nations. Fifteen of these states are specifically Commonwealth realms who recognise the same person as their separate Monarch and Head of State. Grenada is one of these. Despite sharing the same person as their respective monarch, each of the Commonwealth realms, including Grenada, is sovereign and independent of the others.

Development of shared monarchy

The Balfour Declaration of 1926 provided the dominions the right to be considered equal to Britain, rather than subordinate; an agreement that had the result of, in theory, a shared Crown that operates independently in each realm rather than a unitary British Crown under which all the dominions were secondary. The Monarchy thus ceased to be an exclusively British institution, although it has often been called "British" since this time (in both legal and common language) for reasons historical, legal, and of convenience. The Royal and Parliamentary Titles Act 1927 was the first indication of this shift in law, further elaborated in the Statute of Westminster 1931.

Under the Statute of Westminster, Grenada has a common monarchy with Britain and the other Commonwealth realms, and though laws governing the line of succession to the Grenadian throne lie within the control of the Grenadian Parliament, Grenada cannot change the rules of succession without the unanimous consent of the other realms, unless explicitly leaving the shared monarchy relationship by means of a constitutional amendment. This situation applies symmetrically in all the other realms, including the UK.

On all matters of the Grenadian State, the Monarch is advised solely by Grenadian ministers.

Title

In Grenada, the King's official title is: Charles the Third, by the Grace of God, King of Grenada and of His other Realms and Territories, Head of the Commonwealth.

This style communicates Grenada's status as an independent monarchy, highlighting the Monarch's role specifically as King of Grenada, as well as the shared aspect of the Crown throughout the realms. Typically, the Sovereign is styled "King of Grenada", and is addressed as such when in Grenada, or performing duties on behalf of Grenada abroad.

Constitutional role

The role of the Sovereign's representative, the Governor-General, is determined by the Constitution of Grenada (1973) and the constitutional conventions of the Westminster system of parliamentary government. The Governor-General is appointed by the Monarch upon the advice of the Prime Minister of Grenada. The Monarch is informed of the Prime Minister's decision before the Governor General gives Royal Assent. The power to appoint the Prime Minister and other constitutional powers are exclusively vested in the Governor General and not the King himself. As such, the King himself does not exercise reserve powers.

The Grenada Constitution Order in Council was made at the request of the Associated State of Grenada, to provide a new constitution for Grenada, which would come into effect on termination of the status of association of Grenada with the United Kingdom. The order was made under the West Indies Act 1967, and came into operation on 7 February 1974. The Form of Oath of Allegiance prescribed in Schedule 3 is a declaration of allegiance to "His Majesty King Charles the Third, His Heirs and Successors".

Duties

Most of the King's domestic duties are performed by the Governor General. The Governor-General represents the King on ceremonial occasions such as the opening of Parliament, the presentation of honours and military parades. Under the Constitution, he is given authority to act in some matters, for example in appointing and disciplining officers of the civil service, in proroguing Parliament. As in the other Commonwealth realms, however, the Monarch's role, and thereby the vice-regent's role, is almost entirely symbolic and cultural, acting as a symbol of the legal authority under which all governments operate, and the powers that are constitutionally hers are exercised almost wholly upon the advice of the Cabinet, made up of Ministers of the Crown.  It has been said since the death of Queen Anne in 1714, the last monarch to head the British cabinet, that the monarch "reigns" but does not "rule". In exceptional circumstances, however, the Monarch or vice-regal can act against such advice based upon his or her reserve powers.

There are also a few duties which must be specifically performed by, or bills that require assent by the King. These include: signing the appointment papers of the Governor-General, the confirmation of awards of honours, and approving any change in his title.

It is also possible that if the Governor-General decided to go against the Prime Minister's or the government's advice, the Prime Minister could appeal directly to the Monarch, or even recommend that the Monarch dismiss the Governor-General.

Succession

In 2011, Grenada, along with the other Commonwealth prime ministers agreed in the Perth Agreement to amend the rules on the succession to their respective Crowns so that absolute primogeniture would apply for persons born after the date of the agreement (26 March 2015), instead of male-preference primogeniture, and the ban on marriages to Roman Catholics would be lifted, but the monarch would still need to be in communion with the Church of England.

Succession to the throne is by absolute primogeniture, and governed by the provisions of the Succession to the Crown Act 2013, as well as the Act of Settlement and the English Bill of Rights. These documents, though originally passed by the Parliament of England, are now part of the Grenadian constitutional law, under control of the Grenadian parliament only.

This legislation lays out the rules that the Monarch cannot be a Roman Catholic, nor married to one, and must be in communion with the Church of England upon ascending the throne. As Grenada's laws governing succession are currently identical to those of the United Kingdom (by the Statute of Westminster) see Succession to the British Throne for more information.

The heir apparent is Charles III's eldest son, Prince William, who has no official title outside of the UK, but is accorded his UK title, Prince of Wales, as a courtesy title.

Legal role

All laws in Grenada are enacted with the sovereign's, or the vice-regal's signature.  The granting of a signature to a bill is known as Royal Assent; it and proclamation are required for all acts of Parliament, usually granted or withheld by the Governor General. The Vice-Regals may reserve a bill for the Monarch's pleasure, that is to say, allow the Monarch to make a personal decision on the bill. The Monarch has the power to disallow a bill (within a time limit specified by the constitution).

The Sovereign is deemed the "fount of justice," and is responsible for rendering justice for all subjects. The Sovereign does not personally rule in judicial cases; instead, judicial functions are performed in his or her name.  The common law holds that the Sovereign "can do no wrong"; the monarch cannot be prosecuted in his or her own courts for criminal offences.  Civil lawsuits against the Crown in its public capacity (that is, lawsuits against the government) are permitted; however, lawsuits against the Monarch personally are not cognizable. The Sovereign, and by extension the Governor General, also exercises the "prerogative of mercy," and may pardon offences against the Crown. Pardons may be awarded before, during, or after a trial.

In Grenada the legal personality of the State is referred to as "His Majesty the King in Right of Grenada." For example, if a lawsuit is filed against the government, the respondent is formally described as His Majesty the King in Right of Grenada. The monarch as an individual takes no more role in such an affair than in any other business of government.

Royal visits

Grenada was included in the Queen's Caribbean tour of 1966, during which she visited St George's. A Yachting Regatta was in progress in the harbour at the time. A Song of Welcome was sung by local children and the Queen planted a tree, and viewed an agricultural exhibition and a variety performance.

In 1985, the Queen opened Parliament in St George's as well as attending an Investiture and a 'cultural presentation'.

List of Grenadian monarchs

See also

 Figurehead
 Prime Ministers of Queen Elizabeth II
 List of Commonwealth visits made by Queen Elizabeth II
 Monarchies in the Americas
 List of monarchies

References

External links 

 Queen's Official website on Grenada

Government of Grenada
Politics of Grenada
Grenada
Heads of state of Grenada
1974 establishments in Grenada
Monarchies of North America
Kingdoms